Söderblom or Soderblom is a Swedish surname, and may refer to:
 2864 Soderblom, an asteroid named after American planetary geologist Laurence A. Soderblom
 Åke Söderblom (1910–1965), Swedish actor, screenwriter and songwriter
 Lena Söderblom (born 1935), Swedish actress
 Knut Söderblom, CEO of Söderbloms Gjuteri & Mekaniska Verkstad
 Nathan Söderblom (1866–1931), Swedish clergyman, Archbishop of Uppsala in the Church of Sweden, and recipient of the 1930 Nobel Peace Prize
 Nicklas Söderblom, personal trainer, actor, and author
 Anders Søderblom (born 1963), Danish curler

See also 

Södergren